The Calder Cannons is an Australian rules football club from Melbourne, Australia. The club competes in the NAB League, the Victorian Statewide Under-18s competition, and fields squads in the Under-15s, Under-16s and Under-18s. The club was formed in 1995 after the need for two more metropolitan clubs. The geographic catchment area for the club is the north western suburbs of Melbourne extending to cover the Macedon Ranges area.

Honours
Premierships (6): 2001, 2003, 2004, 2007, 2009, 2010
Runners-up (3): 2002, 2006, 2014
Wooden Spoons: Nil

Performances
The club has been a strong competitor since its inception, and in 2006 lost in the final to eventual premiers the Oakleigh Chargers at the MCG. They won the competition in 2001, 2003, 2004 and 2007, and have appeared in 6 out of the last 7 grand finals.

In the 2007 TAC Cup Final, Calder beat the Murray Bushrangers, with Ashley Arrowsmith the winner of the TAC Medal for best on ground. Victorian representatives for Calder at the U18 Championships included Addam Maric, James Polkinghorne, captain Mitchell Farmer and Arrowsmith.

Club information
The club trains and play home matches at the Highgate Recreation Reserve (known since 2014 as RAMS Arena) in northern Craigieburn. It was previously based at the Coburg City Oval in Coburg.

Former Collingwood footballer and Copeland Trophy winner, Robert Hyde, coached the Cannons from 1996 to 2006.  The club's best and fairest award is called the Robert Hyde medal, in honour of Hyde. Currently The Club is the Feeder Club to the Coburg Football Club in the VFL

Players drafted from Calder Cannons
Many notable players in the Australian Football League have been recruited from the Cannons.

1995 – David Round, Darren Milburn, Ashley Fernee
1996 – Mark Kinnear, Jason Johnson, Marcus Barham, Mark Johnson
1997 – Marcus Baldwin, George Bakoulas, Jamie Cann
1998 – Jude Bolton, Teghan Henderson
1999 – Paul Koulouriotis, Ezra Bray, Paul Chapman, Ryan O'Keefe, Adam Pickering, David Johnson
2000 – Jordan Bannister 
2001 – Brent Reilly, James Kelly, David Rodan, Andrew Welsh, Dane Swan, Jordan Barham, Scott Howard, Adan Winter
2002 – Bo Nixon, Tom Lonergan, Brad Murphy, Cameron Wright, Cameron Hunter, Ryan Crowley, Daniel Sipthorp
2003 – Brock McLean, David Trotter, Zac Dawson, Brent Hartigan, Ben Clifton, Adam Bentick
2004 – Lynden Dunn, Matthew Little, James Ezard, Ivan Maric, Jesse W. Smith, Dean Limbach, Adam Iacobucci, Eddie Betts, Jesse D. Smith, Ben Jolley, Nick Becker
2005 – Richard Douglas, Matthew White, Lachlan McKinnon, James Wall, Shane Neaves, Tim O'Keefe
2006 – Jarryd Allen, Peter Faulks
2007 – Addam Maric, Darcy Daniher, James Polkinghorne, Mitchell Farmer, Dean Putt, Aaron Kite, Phil Smith, Ashley Arrowsmith, Jeremy Laidler
2008 – Jackson Trengove, Shaun McKernan, Marcus White, Thomas German
2009 – Jake Melksham, Daniel Talia, Jake Carlisle, Anthony Long, Robert Hicks, Thomas Hunter
2010 – Dion Prestia, Matthew Watson, Mitch Wallis, Cameron Guthrie, Tom Liberatore, Luke Mitchell, Jordan Schroder, 
2011 – Brandon Ellis, Tom Sheridan, Daniel Markworth, Michael Talia, Fraser Dale, Hal Hunter
2012 – Jonathan O'Rourke, Lachie Plowman, Liam McBean, Matthew Dick, Rory Atkins, Sean Gregory
2013 – 
2014 – Paul Ahern, Peter Wright, Jake Lever, Touk Miller, Matthew Goodyear, Jayden Foster, Damien Cavka, Roarke Smith, Reilly O'Brien
2015 – Nick O'Kearney, Callum Moore, Tom Wallis
2016 – Mitchell Lewis, Ben Ronke, Zach Guthrie
2017 – Noah Balta
2018 – Rhylee West, Jack Bytel, Curtis Taylor, Lachlan Sholl
2019 – Harrison Jones, Francis Evans, Sam Ramsay, Lachlan Gollant
2020 – Matthew McLeod-Allison, Josh Eyre, Cody Brand

References

External links

 Calder Cannons home page
 

NAB League clubs
Australian rules football clubs established in 1995
1995 establishments in Australia
Australian rules football clubs in Melbourne
NAB League Girls clubs
Sport in the City of Hume
Sport in the City of Merri-bek